Gabrielsson is a surname. Notable people with the surname include:

Erik Gabrielsson Emporagrius (1606–1674), Swedish professor and bishop
Assar Gabrielsson (1891–1962), Swedish industrialist and co-founder of Volvo
Astrid Gabrielsson (born 1987), Swedish sports sailor
Axel Gabrielsson (1886–1975), Swedish rower who competed in the 1912 Summer Olympics
Charles Gabrielsson (1884–1976), Swedish rower who competed in the 1912 Summer Olympics
Eva Gabrielsson (born 1953), Swedish architect, author, political activist, feminist, partner of Stieg Larsson
Gunnar Gabrielsson (1891–1981), Swedish sport shooter who competed in the 1920 Summer Olympics
K. J. Gabrielsson (1861–1901), Swedish socialist writer and poet
Nils Gabrielsson (1876–1948), Swedish politician
Thomas W. Gabrielsson (born 1963), Swedish actor, active in Sweden and Denmark
Bengt Gabrielsson Oxenstierna (1623–1702), Swedish statesman

See also
 Gabrielson

Swedish-language surnames
Patronymic surnames
Surnames from given names